The Giebel is the northeastern corner of the mountain chain that branches off to the northeast at the Laufbacher Eck. It has a height of 1,949 metres and belongs to the Allgäu grass mountains. Northeast of the Giebel lies the Alpine hut of Giebelhaus, which may be reached on a road from Hinterstein that is not open to the public. From the Giebel there are impressive views down to the Giebelhaus.

No waymarked path leads to the Giebel. It may be ascended, however, from the Feldalpe on trackless terrain. This climb requires a head for heights and sure-footedness. A crossing of the entire ridge from the Giebel via the Berggächtle and the Salober to the Laufbacher Eck is occasionally attempted by experienced mountain climbers (climbing grade UIAA III).

The botany of the Giebel is similar to that of the more famous Höfats or Schneck.

Literature 

 Thaddäus Steiner: Allgäuer Bergnamen, Lindenberg, Kunstverlag Josef Fink, 2007, 
 Zettler/Groth: Alpenvereinsführer Allgäuer Alpen. Munich, Bergverlag Rudolf Rother 1984.

External links 
 

Mountains of the Alps
One-thousanders of Germany
Mountains of Bavaria
Oberallgäu